The College of Engineering, Trivandrum, commonly shortened to CET, is an engineering college in the Indian state of Kerala, situated in Thiruvananthapuram. Founded in 1939 by the Travancore monarch Chithira Thirunal, it is the state's oldest technical institution. It currently offers undergraduate, graduate and research programs in eight branches of engineering and has been affiliated to the APJ Abdul Kalam Technological University since 2015, prior to which it was part of the University of Kerala.

History

On 3 July 1939, the college formally came into existence. The institution owes its foundation to the vision of the Maharajah of Travancore, Sree Chitra Tirunal Balarama Varma. It initially started functioning in the former office and bungalow of the Chief Engineer (which is now the office of the Postmaster General (PMG)). Maj. T. H. Mathewman was appointed as the first principal of the college with Vastuvidya Kushala Sri, Balakrishna Rao and Prof. D. L. Deshpande on the faculty. The college had an intake of 21 students each for the Degree courses in Civil, Mechanical and Electrical branches of Engineering, under the then Travancore University. With the establishment of the Directorate of Technical Education in the late 1950s, the college administration came under the direct control of the government. In 1960, the college was shifted to its present 101 hectare or 250 acre campus at Kulathoor. The undergraduate and postgraduate courses are accredited by AICTE. The college has a library, a central computing facility and a planetarium.

General information

The college was established on 3 July 1939 as a part of the erstwhile University of Travancore, Kerala, India.

The college campus is situated in Kulathoor near Sreekariyam, 13 km from Thiruvananthapuram Central (railway station). Extending over 250 acres (1000,000 m2) of land, it has one of the most spacious campuses in the country. The Masterplan of the campus, and the magnificent main building and other structures in the campus were designed by Prof. Joseph. Chandra Alexander, who was the first Chief Architect and Chief Town planner of the Govt. of Kerala. He was also instrumental in starting the first Architectural education centre of the state in this college.
 
The main building resembles a spanner from the air, around which are spread the departmental buildings, library block, laboratories, workshops, hostels, a planetarium, staff quarters, canteens and stadiums. The campus is one of the greenest in the country, and has won accolades from environmentalists and nature enthusiasts alike.

Regular BTech admissions to this college are based on All Kerala Engineering Entrance Examination. and MTech, based on GATE examination. Besides the regular BTech, BArch, MTech, M.Plan, MBA and MCA programmes, the college also conducts Part Time BTech and MTech classes for meritorious diploma holders. There is Lateral Entry Scheme to admit diploma holders to the second year/third semester of the BTech courses to acquire a degree in engineering based on a state-level entrance examination. The college is constantly top ranked due to its rich alumni support and heritage.

There was a proposal to convert CET to a Centre of Excellence, upgrading it to 'Kerala Institute of Technology (KIT)', so that a technical university can grow around it, but the plan was later dropped to form a new separate single university for all engineering colleges in the state, named KTU.

The college has a vibrant student community running various technical, cultural inter and intra-collegiate festivals, such as 'Demo Week', where final year students dress up according to different themes.

On February 15, 2023, the 83-year-old College of Engineering Thiruvananthapuram (CET) scripted history and became the first State-run college to extend its campus hours till night. Even though the class hours from 9 a.m. to 4 p.m remained unchanged, the  students benefited through unhindered access to the libraries and laboratories for research activities from 9 a.m. to 9 p.m., nearly doubling the previous working hours.

Academic
The college offers undergraduate B.Tech (regular and evening) and B.Arch programs. It also offers part-time and full-time postgraduate programs in engineering and architecture, as well as Master of Business Administration and Master of Computer Applications. Having accreditation by NBA, CET has AICTE preferential funding, top preference from companies conducting campus interviews, exemption from undergoing tests for higher studies and employment in foreign countries that have a tie up with NBA.The following courses of College of Engineering, Trivandrum have been accredited .

 B.Arch			

 Bachelor of Architecure accredited	From Academic Year 2017-18 to 2021-22

 B.Tech			

 Civil Engineering	accredited	till 30-06-2025
 Mechanical Engineering accredited	till 30-06-2025
 Industrial Engineering accredited	till 30-06-2025
 Electrical & Electronics Engineering accredited	till 30-06-2025
 Electronics & Communication Engineering accredited	till 30-06-2025
 Applied Electronics & Instrumentation Engineering accredited	till 30-06-2025
 Computer Science & Engineering accredited	till 30-06-2025

 M.Plan			

 Master of Planning(Housing) accredited	From Academic Year 2017-18 to 2021-22
 M.Arch (Urban Design)
 M.Arch (Environmental Design)

 M.Tech  (Civil Engineering)		

 Structural Engineering accredited	5 years w.e.f  06-05-2014
 Hydraulics Engineering accredited	3 years w.e.f  06-05-2014
 Geotechnical Engineering accredited	5 years w.e.f  06-05-2014
 Environmental Engineering accredited	3 years w.e.f  06-05-2014
 Traffic & Transportation Engineering accredited	5 years w.e.f  06-05-2014

 M.Tech  (Mechanical Engineering)	
		
 Machine Design accredited	5 years w.e.f  06-05-2014
 Thermal Science accredited	5 years w.e.f  06-05-2014
 Propulsion Engineering accredited	5 years w.e.f  06-05-2014
 Industrial Engineering
 Financial Engineering
 Manufacturing & Automation
 Renewable Energy

 M.Tech  (Electrical & Electronics Engineering)			

 Control Systems accredited 3 years w.e.f  04-02-2014
 Power Systems accredited 3 years w.e.f  04-02-2014
 Guidance & Navigational Control accredited 3 years w.e.f  04-02-2014
 Electrical Machines accredited 3 years w.e.f  04-02-2014
 Power Electronics

 M.Tech  ( Electronics  & Communication Engineering)	
		
 Applied Electronics & Instrumentation accredited	3 years w.e.f  08-11-2013
 Signal Processing	accredited 3 years w.e.f  08-11-2013
 Microwave & TV Engineering accredited	5 years w.e.f  06-05-2013
 Micro & Nano Electricals
 Robotics & Automation

 M.Tech  ( Computer Science)	
		
 Computer Science & Engineering
 Information Security
 Artificial Intelligence

 MBA			

 MBA	accredited till 30-06-2022

 MCA

Admissions
The institute admits students based on the following entrance exams.
Undergraduate programmes
 Kerala Engineering Entrance Examination, KEAM conducted by the Office of the Commissioner of Entrance Exams run by the Government of Kerala.
 BTech Lateral Entry Examination, LET conducted by Joint Controller of Technical Examinations by the Government of Kerala.

Postgraduate programmes
 MTech Graduate Aptitude Test in Engineering (GATE) conducted by the Indian Institutes of Technology, IITs.
 MCA Kerala MCA Entrance Examination, conducted by the LBS Centre for Science & Technology.
 MBA Kerala Management Aptitude Test (K MAT) is an entrance examination conducted on a state-level, KMAT is organised in offline (Pen & Paper based) mode for the candidates seeking admission in MBA programmes, CAT conducted by the IIMs and CMAT conducted by AICTE.

Research in CET
Facilities for research work leading to Ph.D degree are available in the departments of Civil Engineering, Mechanical Engineering, Electrical Engineering, Electronics & Communication Engineering, Computer Science Engineering, Architecture and Business administration. The department of Chemistry of College of Engineering Trivandrum is also an approved research centre under University of Kerala. Opportunities exist for candidates to do full-time as well as part-time research in the college with registration under APJ Abdul Kalam Technological University.

The admission to Ph.D degree is through entrance test & interview conducted by APJ Abdul Kalam Technological University once a year. This admission process is common for PhD full time with and without fellowship,  PhD part time for faculty working in colleges affiliated to the
University & PhD part time for external candidates. The fellowships for this Ph.D, limited in number is paid by either the APJ Abdul Kalam Technological University or Department of Higher Education, Government of Kerala.

College of Engineering, Trivandrum is also a approved Minor Centre under AICTE QIP (Quality Improvement Programme) providing opportunities to faculty members of the degree-level engineering institutions to improve their qualification by offering admissions to Master’s and Ph.D. degree Programme.

In 2018 & 2019 College of Engineering, Trivandrum was a nodal center for direct Ph.D admission under AICTE National Doctoral Fellowship (NDF).In 2020 AICTE rebranded NDF into a new multidisciplinary research fellowship  called AICTE Doctoral Fellowship (ADF) aimed to enhance the research culture in AICTE approved Institutions. In this scheme 363 Nos. of fellowship are spread across 42 selected Universities in India. Out of this only 10 are available in Kerala, which is under APJ Abdul Kalam Technological University. Out of these 10 fellowships, 3 fellowships are assigned to College of Engineering Trivandrum. Both NDF Research scholars & ADF Scholars are paid fellowships directly by AICTE and is same as that of IIT's & NIT's.

Rankings

College of Engineering, Trivandrum was ranked 110 among engineering colleges by the National Institutional Ranking Framework (NIRF) in 2022.

Architecture department of College of Engineering, Trivandrum was ranked 14 among architecture colleges by the National Institutional Ranking Framework (NIRF) in 2022.

For the year 2022, College of Engineering Trivandrum submitted details for National Institutional Ranking Framework (NIRF) in Engineering, Architecture & Management, but got ranking only for Engineering & Architecture.

Facilities
Centre of Excellence in Fluid Dynamics "FDLAB"
Micro/Nano fluidics Research Laboratory
BOSCH REXROTH-CET CENTRE OF EXCELLENCE IN AUTOMATION TECHNOLOGIES
 FABLAB
 Innovation Centre
 Technical Business Incubator
 Electrical Engineering Testing Lab
 Sree Chithira Thirunal Centre For Computing
 Career Guidance and Placement Unit (CGPU)
 Indoor Stadium
 Open Air Theater
 Technical library
 Central Computing Facility (CCF)
 Planetarium
 Hostels (only few students getting Hostel facilities)
 WiFi Connectivity

Student Clubs/Organizations 

College of Engineering Trivandrum has 36 Officially recognized student clubs ranging from technical to non technical. They are:

1. SAEINDIA CET

CET also has a student chapter of SAE- the Society of Automotive Engineers, the century-old society Thomas Alva Edison, Henry Ford and numerous other greats were members of. Students from CET have participated in SAE INDIA National competitions like the Baja and Efficycle. SAE INDIA CET regularly holds educative sessions on automotive technology- from bicycles and skateboards to trains and rockets. The student chapter also trains students in CAD. There are 4 clubs under SAEINDIA CET namely FARRAGO, Zenith, Excelerators & Herakles.

2. IEEE SB CET

IEEE activities in CET were initiated on 15 June 1983 as student branch under the Kerala section. It was revived in the year 2008. As of January 2012, CET IEEE Student Branch has around 100 student members. The Student Branch has a library. One affinity group called IEEE Women in Engineering is running under this Student Branch and six societies. The student branch won many prizes as well as represented the college in many international avenues, including the best website award in the Asia Pacific region in 2010, represented Kerala in the Asia Pacific Student Congress at New Zealand, won prizes in the student poster and paper contest at the Global Humanitarian Technology conference at Seattle etc. The team of student branch officers consists of chair, vice-chair, treasurer and secretary.

3. IET

The Institution of Engineering and Technology is one of the world's leading professional societies for the engineering and technology community, with more than 160,000 members in 127 countries and offices in Europe, North America and Asia-Pacific.  The Institution of Engineering and Technology Students chapter in College of Engineering was initiated in 2009. The IET CET http://ietcet.org has a library and an embedded systems research lab at the college. It has over 125 members in the college. The IET Chapter in the college won the Best Chapter Award under the Chennai Local Network in 2009. The chapter's activities include conducting workshops, seminars and technical competitions. Innovation Challenge is an annual event hosted by the chapter to ignite the innovation passion among the engineering Students of Kerala.

4. ISTE SC CET

The Indian Society for Technical Education Student Chapter is the largest technical society in the college with more than 80% of the student body as its members. It provides a platform for students to showcase their talents. Ever since its formation, ISTE Students Chapter has helped its members scale heights of technical excellence through the numerous events it has conducted. The ISTE Student Chapter has successfully organised intra-collegiate tech fests such as Prarambh, Exodus, Semfiesta and Persona along with several talks, workshops, quizzes and business events every year. There have been two National Level techfests 'Aavishkar' in 2006 and 2009. ISTE CET is the best ISTE student chapter in India.

5. RoboCET

RoboCET is the robotics club of CET formed by a group of robotic enthusiasts among the students of the college. RoboCET was established in April 2008. The activities of this club include conducting classes, workshops and exhibitions on robotics. RoboCET has organised various robotics competitions inside and outside the college.

6. AeroCET

7. AstroCET

8. Google Developer Student Club CET

9. IGS CET

10. ICI CET STUDENT CHAPTER

11. American society of civil engineers

12. Mathletes CET

13. IEDC CET

The Innovation & Entrepreneurship Development Cell (IEDC) is a fully functioning student body registered under the Technology Business Incubator (TBI) of the College of Engineering Trivandrum. The club provides a platform for students with ideas to convert them into business reality. The stated aim of IEDC is to foster a student start-up culture in the institution. Club activities include seminars by firms such as Blackberry, classes on the basics of the Stock Market, sponsorship activities, talks with prominent start up ventures and trips to events all over India like Hackathons and Entrepreneurship Conferences. The Cell, started in late 2011, already has 3 start-ups registered under it.

14. National Cadet Corps

A Naval NCC unit was formed in 2020 under 1(K)naval battalion with allotted strength of 50 an year.

15. NSS CET

The National Service Scheme primarily stands for channelising the student youth for building the nation. The youth in all ages has been in the vanguard of progress and social change. On 18 October 2006 NSS CET (with unit no. 147) was inaugurated.
NSS is now the most active organisation in the college. NSS cet is now capable of conducting even more than 25 programmes a year in midst of a busy academic schedule. Also from a bunch of students at the time of formation, the number of NSS volunteers is now more than a hundred. Also NSS cet is now an established one with a website and a special room for its activities. Last year NSS even came up with an alumni section, a rare thing for an organisation in college. As part of the new requirement of A.P.J. Kalam Technological University, a new unit of NSS was started.

16. CET BBC club

17. Coders Club

18. SCORE@CET

It is  the official research & publication club of CET. SCORE@CET is a student run, faculty guided & alumni supported research group serving as a platform to promote research activities in CET. In other words its a "Student Club of Research Enthusiasts" consisting of all research enthusiasts students from UG Programs, PG Programs & Research Scholars of CET. . It was initiated by CET Alumni under the banner of CETAA & was officially inaugurated on December 6th, 2022. The objectives of the club is to inculcate the research culture and promote research activities among CET Students & to make CET a research hub. As of now, it is currently the "Only Research Club" in any Engineering Colleges of State of Kerala. The various activities of SCORE@CET includes conducting monthly research talks by eminent Researchers, exploring the possibilities of inter disciplinary & multi disciplinary research & providing a platform for researchers to discuss their research problems & interact with renowned researchers in their field. Moreover the club publishes a bi -monthly newsletter called "Research Insights" detailing various research activities of CET.

19. Innovation Centre

The Innovation Centre is a lab facility operated for the students by the students of CET. It was established in May 2012 and has become the den of geeks and Greeks in the college. Unlike most other technical organisations in the college, Innovation centre is government funded (by CERD). The Innovation Centre is open 24 x 7, with supervision. The facility also organises talks and training sessions in technical activities and also acts as a think tank where students meet to discuss their ideas on technical advances. In addition to it activities within the college, Innovation Centre CET hosts EUREKA, a statewide project competition annually. It is also a guidance center where students get advice and help for their projects and tech related activities. Working in unison with the IPR cell and the Technology Business Incubation (TBI) facility, the Innovation Centre also helps students in patenting and marketing the technologies they develop.

20. CET Quiz Club

CET Quiz Club is one of the oldest and most active club in CET. CET QC conducts weekly informal sessions and other regular quizzing events in college. The club also organizes the inter college and open quiz competitions during Dhwani (Cultural fest) and Drishti (Tech fest), among others. One of the most awaited annual quizzing event, Eroteme, is conducted by the QC and attended by quizzers in and out of the state. Quiz Master Major Chandrakant Nair has hosted all 4 editions of Eroteme.

21. TinkerHub CET

The idea behind a community like TinkerHub is for students, to get exposed to technology, resources and people, outside of the curriculum and to enhance interaction between multiple departments, with year of study, being no bar for entry. What one faces when stepping out of college is a world of competition and without a strong backing of the latest in technology, making a name for oneself will be hard. This also involves the acquisition of internships, authoring or research papers, seizing research opportunities to the extent of patent filing. The key separator is that it is a community for all, with absolutely no barriers to entry.

22. Amateur Radio Club

23. Malayalam Club CET

24. Under 25 CET

25. CET Film Society

The official film club of College of Engineering Trivandrum, which conducts student film festivals, panel discussions, film reviews, short film competitions, etc. in the college. The club has an active presence among the students through the social media.

26. CETunes

27. H2O CET
H2O CET is the official CET student wing of Helping Hands Organisation, NGO based out of Trivandrum, that focuses on autism and disability Rehabilitation along with providing holistic education to underprivileged children. With a volunteer strength of more than 100, many college level events are organized for fund raising for the NGO. Along with that student volunteers take active participation in weekly classes and elderly help initiatives.

28. CHATURANGA CET

29. WATCH THE FREAKZ

30. Internship Cell CET

31. Intellectual Property Rights Cell

32. PRISM CET

33. LitSoc CET

34. CETalks

CETALKS is the original in- house talk show of College of Engineering, Trivandrum. It was a talk series program that was founded in January 2015 during the 75th anniversary celebrations of the college. Eminent personalities from various fields of expertise address the college audience under this program. CETALKS is a regular dose of inspiration to students and faculty alike. Societies such as SAE INDIA CET, IEEE SB CET, Innovation Centre and STEAM tables have organised professional discourses under this banner. Cetalks is also the name of the college's official radio. New shows are aired occasionally at 9 pm on weekends.

35. Investor CET

36. CET Shutterbugs

The official photography club of College of Engineering Trivandrum, to promote creativity through photography, to share and critique the photographs of peers, to educate and improve technical skills, and to spread the love of photography throughout the CET community.

Notable alumni

 S. Krishna Kumar – Former Union Minister, Government of India
 G. Madhavan Nair – Former chairman of ISRO and Secretary to the Department of Space, Government of India.
 D. Babu Paul – Bureaucrat and Author
 V. R. Lalithambika – Director, Directorate of Human Space Program, Indian Space Research Organisation (ISRO)
 Jayaraj – Film director National award winner
 Joy Vazhayil IAS - Chief Secretary, Govt. of Kerala
 M. P. Parameswaran – Nuclear scientist, now full-time activist with the Kerala Sastra Sahitya Parishad.
 Mini Shaji Thomas, Former Director, Indian Institute of Information Technology, Tiruchirappalli
 Anand – Malayalam fiction writer and essayist
 Venu Nagavally – Film actor, director and writer
 G. Shankar – An architect from Kerala
 Alexis Leon – is an Indian software consultant
 T. G. Mohandas – Orator, writer and critic
 K. S. Sabarinathan – Member of the Kerala Legislative Assembly for Aruvikara
 Eugene Pandala – Architect known for building with environmental sustainability
 M. Jayachandran – Music Director and Singer, National Award winner
 Erickavu N. Sunil – National Award Winning Mridangam Artist
 Manoj Vasudevan – An International speaker, author, consultant and coach.
 Basil Joseph – Film director and actor
 Soumya Sadanandan – Film director and TV anchor
Unnimaya Prasad -Film actor, kerala state award winner

Films
 The global meet held in Bangalore in December 2012 commissioned a film on the College of Engineering, Trivandrum. It is a detailed history of the college. The title of the film is "Realization of a dream"

References

External links

 

Engineering colleges in Thiruvananthapuram
Educational institutions established in 1939
1939 establishments in India
APJ Abdul Kalam Technological University